Tania Choudhury (born 1995) is a female international Indian lawn bowler. She hails from Guwahati, an Engineering graduate from Assam Engineering College and an MBA from the Tezpur University, Assam.

Bowls career

Commonwealth Games
Choudhury has represented India at two Commonwealth Games in 2010 when she became the youngest lawn bowls player to compete at the 2010 Commonwealth Games where her triples team finished top of Pool B but missed out on a bronze medal after losing to England in the play off. Four years later she competed at the 2014 Commonwealth Games.

In 2022, she competed in the women's singles and the women's triples at the 2022 Commonwealth Games.

World Championships
In 2020 she was selected for the 2020 World Outdoor Bowls Championship in Australia.

Asia Pacific
Choudhury has won three medals at the Asia Pacific Bowls Championships. She won a fours bronze medal in 2009 and a double bronze in the singles and triples at the 2019 Asia Pacific Bowls Championships in the Gold Coast, Queensland.

References

Living people
Bowls players at the 2010 Commonwealth Games
Bowls players at the 2014 Commonwealth Games
Bowls players at the 2022 Commonwealth Games
Indian sportspeople
1995 births
Indian bowls players
Commonwealth Games competitors for India